The following is a complete episode listing for The Real Adventures of Jonny Quest.

Series overview

Episodes

Season 1 (1996–97)

Season 2 (1996–97)

External links 
 

Jonny Quest
Lists of American children's animated television series episodes
Lists of Cartoon Network television series episodes